Damon Records was a United States record label.

Original 
Damon was headquartered in Kansas City, Missouri. Damon used musicians and singers who were not members of the American Federation of Musicians labor union to make recordings during the ban on Union recordings ordered by James Petrillo.

In May 1948, the singing duo of Jon and Sondra Steele released "My Happiness" on Damon Records, a fact that was acknowledged on sheet music promoting the song. One of the better known artists with Damon was big band bandleader Al Trace. The Al Trace Orchestra recorded for major labels in the 1940s in addition to Damon. Trace was a writer on several popular songs, including "If I'd Known You Were Coming I'd Have Baked a Cake."

The label was still in existence up to at least 1960, when a rock 'n' roll group from Pittsburg, Kan., Conny and the Bellhops, had a regional hit with a 45 titled "Shot Rod," an instrumental on the Damon label.

Rebirth 

Damon was a Canadian music label during the 1970's and 1980s. The Edmonton-based label released several notable artists including Juno nominee Jimmy Arthur Ordge, country singer-songwriter Jack Hennig, The Rodeo Song's  Garry Lee and the Showdown, Bob and Doug McKenzie's 1981 The Great White North album, and polka great Bob Kames.
In 2010, a small group of people "relaunched" Damon Records as an independent record label. The label's primary genre focus is indie rock music, different from the types of music that the original Damon Records put out.

See also 
 List of record labels

References

External links
 Rockin' Country Style
 Damon Record Co. Website
 Damon Records on the Internet Archive's Great 78 Project

Damon Records